Alexandra Piscupescu (born 10 June 1994) is a retired Romanian rhythmic gymnast. She is a 6-time Romanian National champion.

Career 
Piscupescu as a junior has competed at the 2009 Irina Deleanu Cup where she won the junior all-around gold medal.

Piscupescu debuted as a senior in 2010, she competed at the 2010 World Championships in Moscow and 2011 World Championships in Montpellier, France where she finished 17th in all-around. She participated at the 2012 London Test Event where she finished 5th place in All Around Final.
Picupescu finished 18th in all-around at the 2012 European Championships in Nizhny Novgorod, Russia.

In 2013, Piscupescu won her first World cup medals at the 2013 Irina Deleanu Cup, she won silver in hoop and ball, bronze in ribbon final. Piscupescu finished 17th at the 2013 World Championships All-around final behind Azeri gymnast Marina Durunda.

In 2014, Piscupescu won the 2014 Irina Deleanu Cup. On 10–15 June Piscupescu competed at the 2014 European Championships and finished 18th in all-around. She then competed at the 2014 World Championships placing 32nd in the all-around qualifications. She won her 6th National title, where she also announced her retirement from Rhythmic Gymnastics after the competition.

In 2015, Piscupescu made a comeback in RG in August, Piscupescu finished 22nd in the all-around at the 2015 Budapest World Cup. On 9–13 September Piscupescu competed at the 2015 World Championships in Stuttgart finishing 33rd in the All-around qualifications and did not advance into the Top 24 finals.

References

External links
 

1994 births
Living people
Romanian rhythmic gymnasts
Gymnasts from Bucharest
20th-century Romanian women
21st-century Romanian women